Offenau is a town in the district of Heilbronn in Baden-Württemberg in Germany.

References

Heilbronn (district)
Populated places on the Neckar basin
Populated riverside places in Germany